State of Cambodia may refer to:

 Cambodia, as a state
 State of Cambodia (1989–1993) (SOC), the name adopted by the pro-Hanoi People's Republic of Kampuchea (PRK) during its transitional times until the restoration of the monarchy
 Semi-official name of Cambodia between the 18 March 1970 coup and the proclamation of the Khmer Republic on October 9, the same year

See also 
 Republic of Kampuchea (disambiguation)